Centre Plaza is a 51-floor 238 metre (781 foot) tall skyscraper completed in 2004 located in Tianjin, China.

The building was constructed by a joint venture of Shun Tak Tianjin Investment, a company indirectly owned by Shun Tak Holdings for 50% non-voting deferred shares (another 50% from an unknown British Virgin Islands investor) and Tianjin TEDA Group (a wholly owned subsidiary of TEDA Holding), thus the Chinese name of the property was an acronym that took one word each from the two companies. It includes offices and residences.

The original shareholders of the developer was also included Zhongyuan General Merchandise.

See also
 List of tallest buildings in China
 List of tallest buildings in the world

References

External links
 
Emporis.com – Tianjin Xinda Plaza
SkyscraperPage.com - Tianjin Xinda Plaza

Skyscraper office buildings in Tianjin
Buildings and structures completed in 2004
2004 establishments in China
Residential skyscrapers in China
Skyscrapers in Tianjin